Faith Terryson, known professionally as Faithvonic, is a Liberian singer and songwriter from Grand Bassa County. She is also a fashion designer, graphic designer, content creator, and video director. Faithvonic derived her stage name from her first name and mother's name, and started writing and recording music in 2012. She signed a record deal with Kimmie Weeks' KLW Entertainment in 2014, but left the label in 2016 after her contract expired. On February 14, 2021, she released her debut extended play, titled Rich with You, to coincide with Valentine's Day. She has released music to raise awareness about Ebola and COVID-19, and has partnered with ActionAid Liberia on several humanitarian projects. 
Faithvonic's music is a mixture of Afropop and hipco.

Life and career

1995–2008: Early life and education
Faithvonic is a member of the Bassa tribe. She has four siblings and was raised by a single mother; her father died when she was two years old. She was physically and mentally abused by her stepfather while growing up. She started singing at the age of 10, and used music as a coping mechanism to deal with her childhood trauma. In 2008, she moved to the Philippines to study at Southville International School and Colleges. She also studied information technology and graphic design at Starz College of Science and Technology in Liberia.

2012–present: Career beginnings, singles and Rich with You 
In 2012, Faithvonic started writing and recording her own music. She derived her stage name from her first name and mother's name Yvonne. In 2014, Faithvonic signed a record deal with KLW Entertainment, a record label owned by Kimmie Weeks. That same year, she and other artists formed the music collective LATA, an acronym for Liberia Artists Together for Advancement. The group recorded "The Hope Song", a track that raises awareness about Liberia's Ebola virus epidemic; the song was created in partnership with ActionAid Liberia. Faithvonic signed a new record deal with Nebo Records after her contract with KLW Entertainment expired in 2016. Her debut single under Nebo Records, titled "Come For Me", was released in April 2017. In August 2020, Faithvonic partnered with ActionAid Liberia to release the COVID-19 awareness song "Africa Fight".

In January 2021, she collaborated with DJ Weezy, Natif, Fullest 4, and Young Classic to release "Bassa First Bassa Last", the official County Meet song. She lent vocals to Angel Dweh's Afropop single "Come Over", which was released on January 15, 2021. On February 14, 2021, Faithvonic released her debut extended play, titled Rich with You, to coincide with Valentine's Day. The EP comprises 6 tracks and features guest appearances from Stunna, T Crack, and Kpanto. It was initially intended to be released as an album but due to the COVID-19 pandemic, her team decided to release it as an EP. Produced by Mr. Valuable and Stunnashine, all of the songs on Rich with You are personal and depict real life events. Faithvonic dedicated the EP's title track "Rich with You" to her fans and partner.

In October 2022, Faithvonic released the single "Badway"; described as "an up-tempo, fast-paced ode to love", the song features vocals by Takun J and PCK. She dedicated the song to lovers and newlyweds and said listeners would easily relate to it. She is a brand ambassador for several brands, including Glow Liberia, GC Luxury Beauty, and Zara Mall.

Humanitarian works
Faithvonic partnered with ActionAid Liberia to hold a public dialogue at Red Light Market, where she spoke to men about violence against women. She has also been involved with ActionAid Liberia's Safe Cities campaign and Activista youth network. Moreover, she is a Girls Rights ambassador for the NGO, and has helped empower young girls across Liberia to advocate for their rights. Faithvonic founded the "Speak Out Loud" foundation, an initiative that provides education for street sellers and underprivileged girls.

Artistry and influences
Faithvonic's music is a mixture of Afropop and hipco. In an interview with Euronews, she said she makes music to uplift people and that creating music helps her cope with personal trauma. The organization ActionAid stated that her music "amplify voices of young and often marginalized people" and "acts as a medium for creativity and innovation whilst raising awareness to change social behaviour". Faithvonic has cited Oprah Winfrey, Beyoncé, Shakira, and Ciara as her key influences.

Discography

EPs
Rich with You (2021)

Awards and nominations

See also
List of Liberian musicians

References

External links

Liberian women musicians
Living people
People from Grand Bassa County
Liberian singers
Liberian songwriters
Bassa people (Liberia)